Colne Valley is a valley in West Yorkshire.

Colne Valley may also refer to:

 Colne Valley (UK Parliament constituency), the constituency of this name in the West Yorkshire valley
 Colne Valley, Essex, 
 Colne Valley Railway, a  heritage railway located in the Essex Valley
 the valley of the River Colne, Hertfordshire
 Colne Valley Regional Park, a park located in Buckinghamshire and other counties